Platytes platysticha is a moth in the family Crambidae. It was described by Turner in 1939. It is found in Australia, where it has been recorded from Tasmania.

The wingspan is about 23 mm.

References

Crambini
Moths described in 1939
Moths of Australia